Dalian Transcendence Football Club was a Chinese football club based in Dalian, Liaoning. Founded in 2013, the club played in the Chinese professional league between 2014 and 2018. They quit from the professional league and turn as amateur in January 2019 when failing to apply professional league license.

History
Dalian Transcendence F.C. was established on 18 November 2013 by Zhao Yang with a registered capital of 3 million Yuan to participate in the third tier of Chinese football at the beginning of the 2014 China League Two season. As a publicly listed football club Zhao Yang would proclaim that this model had already seen investment reach 10 million Yuan and he would be reinvesting that money on educating the team's youth system. Liu Zhongchang was brought in as the club's manager while the club's recruitment policy saw them actively bring in recently defunct Dalian Shide F.C. players, which included Han Jiabao, Hao Xingchen, Hu Zhaojun, Nan Yunqi, and Yan Song. With the club choosing the same blue home jersey colours and using the same home ground of Jinzhou Stadium it saw many within the Chinese media to believe that Dalian Transcendence were actively claiming to be the successor to Dalian Shide, Zhao Yang proclaimed to be neutral on the matter.

The club's first competitive game would be on 30 March 2014 against Guangxi Liuzhou Liuyue in the first round of the 2014 Chinese FA Cup where they won their game 3–0 at home. The club's debut appearance within the league saw them come third within the league's group stages, however within the knock-out phase they were eliminated by Guizhou Zhicheng F.C. on away goals. The following season the club would reach the divisions Play-off final where they lost the tie to Meizhou Kejia F.C. on penalties, however despite coming runners-up they still gained promotion to the second tier.

In July 2018, the team signed naming sponsorship for the first time in club history, with local car dealer Dalian Huifeng, to compete as Dalian Huifeng Automobile Plaza for the rest of the 2018 season.

On January 13, 2019, after their relegation in the 2018 season, Transcendence lost their license to compete in the 2019 China League Two, as they failed to sign the salary confirmation files. The club announced they decided to quit from the professional league and turn as amateur one day later.

Retired numbers

17 –  Wang Renlong, Forward, 2014 posthumous. The number was retired in November 2014.

Managerial history
  Liu Zhongchang (2014 – 13 April 2016)
  Sun Feng (caretaker) (15 April 2016 – 21 April 2016)
  Ermin Šiljak (21 April 2016 – 10 August 2016)
  Rusmir Cviko (10 August 2016 – 8 August 2017)
  Li Guoxu (8 August 2017 – 18 April 2018)
  Dželaludin Muharemović (18 April 2018 – 31 December 2018)

Results
All-time league rankings

As of the end of 2018 season.

 In group stage.

Key
<div>

 Pld = Played
 W = Games won
 D = Games drawn
 L = Games lost
 F = Goals for
 A = Goals against
 Pts = Points
 Pos = Final position

 DNQ = Did not qualify
 DNE = Did not enter
 NH = Not Held
 – = Does Not Exist
 R1 = Round 1
 R2 = Round 2
 R3 = Round 3
 R4 = Round 4

 F = Final
 SF = Semi-finals
 QF = Quarter-finals
 R16 = Round of 16
 Group = Group stage
 GS2 = Second Group stage
 QR1 = First Qualifying Round
 QR2 = Second Qualifying Round
 QR3 = Third Qualifying Round

Seasons

References

External links
Club website

Defunct football clubs in China
 
2013 establishments in China
Association football clubs established in 2013
Sport in Dalian
Football clubs in Liaoning
2019 disestablishments in China
Association football clubs disestablished in 2019